Najafabad-e Sorkhi (also Romanized as Najafābād-e Sorkhī; also known as Najafābād) is a village in Khvajehei Rural District, Meymand District, Firuzabad County, Fars Province, Iran. At the 2006 census, its population was 301, in 73 families.

References 

Populated places in Firuzabad County